Chlorida spinosa is a species of beetle in the family Cerambycidae. It was described by Per Olof Christopher Aurivillius in 1887. It is known from Colombia, Bolivia and Peru. Adult males produce (6E,8Z)-6,8-pentadecadienal, an attractant pheromone.

References

Bothriospilini
Beetles described in 1887
Beetles of South America
Taxa named by Per Olof Christopher Aurivillius